Bettina Stumpf (born ) is a German female volleyball player. She was part of the Germany women's national volleyball team.

She participated in the 2004 FIVB Volleyball World Grand Prix.
On club level she played for SSV Ulm Aliud Pharma, GER in 2004.

References

External links
 Profile at FIVB.org
http://www.cev.lu/Competition-Area/PlayerDetails.aspx?TeamID=3435&PlayerID=13131&ID=132
http://www.schwaebische.de/home_artikel,-_arid,2510053.html
http://abteilung.volleyball-rottenburg.de/team/view/id/77/tab/archivimg/type/volleyball

1984 births
Living people
German women's volleyball players
Place of birth missing (living people)